Agriocnemis inversa is a species of damselfly in the family Coenagrionidae. It is found in the Democratic Republic of the Congo, Djibouti, Ethiopia, Kenya, Sudan, and Uganda.

References

Coenagrionidae
Insects described in 1899
Taxonomy articles created by Polbot